Alexandra Bridge is a locality in the South West region of Western Australia.

References

Towns in Western Australia
South West (Western Australia)